Deutzia ningpoensis is a shrub in the family Hydrangeaceae.  The species is endemic to China. It grows to between 1 and 2.5 metres high and produces panicles of white flowers from May to July in its native range.

References

ningpoensis
Endemic flora of China
Plants described in 1911